Pierre Christophe (16 July 1880 – 13 February 1971) was a French sculptor. His work was part of the sculpture event in the art competition at the 1928 Summer Olympics.

References

1880 births
1971 deaths
20th-century French sculptors
20th-century French male artists
French male sculptors
Olympic competitors in art competitions
People from Seine-Saint-Denis